Gwyn Williams (birth year unknown – death year unknown) was a Welsh rugby union and professional rugby league footballer who played in the 1930s.

Playing career

International honours
Gwyn Williams won a cap for Wales (RL) while at Wigan in 1939.

County Cup Final appearances
Gwyn Williams played , i.e. number 5, in Wigan's 10-7 victory over Salford in the 1938–39 Lancashire County Cup Final during the 1938–39 season at Station Road, Swinton on Saturday 22 October 1938.

References

External links
Statistics at wigan.rlfans.com

Cardiff RFC players
Footballers who switched code
Rugby league centres
Rugby league utility players
Rugby league wingers
Wales national rugby league team players
Welsh rugby league players
Welsh rugby union players
Wigan Warriors players
Year of birth missing
Place of birth missing
Possibly living people